Mohammed Elias Razi was an Indian politician, belonging to the Workers Party of India. He was elected four times to the West Bengal Legislative Assembly, being elected from the Harishchandrapur constituency in 1957, 1967, 1969 and 1971.

In the 1980 Indian parliamentary election WPI fielded Mohammed Elias Razi in the Raiganj constituency. He obtained 13,554 votes (2.89%).

References

Workers Party of India politicians
Possibly living people
Year of birth missing
West Bengal MLAs 1957–1962
West Bengal MLAs 1967–1969
West Bengal MLAs 1969–1971
West Bengal MLAs 1971–1972